Dukes of Windsor were an Australian electronic rock group. Although formed in Melbourne, Australia, they were based in Berlin, Germany. They are notable for their single "It's a War", released in Australia in 2008 and in Europe in early 2010, as well as their song "The Others", remixed by Australian electronic group TV Rock. They "fuse minimalist rhythms, punchy bass-lines, cascading guitar riffs, and glacial synths". Their music has been described as "angular and reductive, groovy and melodic", and has been termed the beautiful paradox of "robotic soul".

Biography

The Dukes' career began with the release of the EP Foxhunt in 2005. Debut album The Others followed in 2006, produced in Melbourne by expatriate American Jonathan Burnside (Faith No More, Nirvana). Extra production, mixing and mastering were provided by hardcore producers Pelle Henricsson and Eskil Lövström (Refused – The Shape of Punk to Come, Poison the Well, Hell Is for Heroes) from Tonteknik Studios in Umea, Sweden. After the release of the album, the band embarked on an intensive schedule of touring around Australia. After extensive national radio play, they were showcased as a Next Crop Artist by national broadcaster Triple J in November 2006.

In 2007, the remix of their debut single "The Others" was certified Gold in Australia (50,000 copies), was a top 10 ARIA single, spent three months at #1 on the ARIA Club Chart, and received an ARIA Award nomination. The guys also closed out the MTV Australian Music Video Awards ceremony in Sydney that year.

Second album Minus was released through Island Records in Australia in late 2008. To record the album, the band reunited with Pelle and Eskil, travelling to Tonteknik Studios in the Swedish winter. The album's title both represents these sub-zero temperatures, as well as the fresh clinical approach to the album. The stark sound is balanced with warm synth textures and vocals.

After the release of Minus, the band took in a string of sell-out gigs in capital cities, as well as completing dates nationally with Sneaky Sound System, Sam Sparro, The Music and The Vines. The band also featured heavily on Australian national broadcaster Triple J, with two Number One Most Played songs, and television performances on both Rove Live ("It's a War") and The Footy Show ("Get It"). Three singles were released from Minus, including "It's a War", "Get It" (both 2008), and "Runaway" (2009). The video clip for "Runaway" was also featured as a Ripe Clip of the Week on national music television channel Channel [V].

In December 2009 the band relocated to Berlin, Germany to continue writing their third full-length album. After signing a management and joint venture deal with local indie label Motor Music, they also released the album It's a War, an album of selected songs from both Minus and The Others. Since then, they are preparing to self-produce their next full-length album.

Band members
 Jack Weaving – vocals
 Oscar Dawson – guitars
 Joe Franklin – bass guitar
 Scott Targett – keyboards, programming
 Mirra Seigerman – drums

Discography

Studio albums

Compilation albums

Extended Plays

Singles

Awards and nominations

ARIA Music Awards
The ARIA Music Awards is an annual awards ceremony that recognises excellence, innovation, and achievement across all genres of Australian music.

|-
| 2007 || "The Others" (with TV Rock)|| ARIA Award for Best Dance Release || 
|-

References

External links
 Official band-administered blog
 Official EU website
 Official website
 MySpace page
 Official fan club

Australian rock music groups